Yvonna Ježová (born 21 July 1966) is a Czech sports shooter. She competed in two events at the 1988 Summer Olympics.

References

External links
 

1966 births
Living people
Czech female sport shooters
Olympic shooters of Czechoslovakia
Shooters at the 1988 Summer Olympics
People from Hranice (Přerov District)
Sportspeople from the Olomouc Region